Chancaca is a typical Bolivian, Chilean and Peruvian, warm, sweet sauce made of raw unrefined sugar from sugarcane. It is often flavored with orange peel and cinnamon, and is consumed on sopaipillas or picarones.

Chancaca is also a synonym for panela, the unrefined sugar used to make chancaca syrup.

In Colombia, chancacas are a traditional coconut candy.

See also
 List of dessert sauces

References

Peruvian cuisine
Chilean sauces
Bolivian cuisine
Dessert sauces
Sugars

es:Chancaca